East Lynne on the Western Front is a 1931 British comedy film directed by George Pearson and starring Herbert Mundin, Mark Daly and Alf Goddard. It was made at the Lime Grove Studios.

Plot
During the First World War a group of British soldiers serving on the Western Front stage a comic performance of the play East Lynne to entertain their comrades.

Cast
 Herbert Mundin as Bob Cox / Lady Isobel
 Mark Daly as Maurice / Levison
 Alf Goddard as Ben / Cornelia
 Hugh E. Wright as Fred
 Edwin Ellis as Sam / Barbara Hare
 Harold French as Reggie Pitt
 Adele Blanche as Mimi
 Wilfrid Lawson as Dick Webb / Carlyle
 Escott Davies as Joe / Little Willie
 Roger Livesey as Sandy
 Philip Godfrey as Jack / Hare
 Norman Shelley as Tony Wilson

References

Bibliography
 Low, Rachael. Filmmaking in 1930s Britain. George Allen & Unwin, 1985.
 Wood, Linda. British Films, 1927-1939. British Film Institute, 1986.

External links

1931 films
1930s war comedy films
1930s English-language films
British war comedy films
British World War I films
Films directed by George Pearson
Films set in France
Films set in 1915
Films shot at Lime Grove Studios
British black-and-white films
1931 comedy films
1930s British films